"Reggaetonera" is a song by Puerto Rican rapper and singer Anuel AA and was released on May 29, 2020, as the third single from his second studio album Emmanuel.

Music video 
The video was released on June 18, 2020, and has so far received over 180 million views on YouTube. In the video Anuel shows the flags of the various Latin American countries.

Controversy 
A group of Bolivian rappers accused Anuel AA of showing the Bolivian flag in reverse in the video of the song. Anuel's answer was not long in coming: "Bolivia excuse me, I love you! It was a production error, we didn't realise! My last concert was in Bolivia, the love they showed me was legendary! Love and respect is what I have for you."

Charts

Weekly charts

Year-end charts

Certifications

References 

2020 singles
Anuel AA songs